771 Naval Air Squadron of the Fleet Air Arm was formed on 24 May 1939 at Lee-on-Solent as a Fleet Requirements Unit with 14 Fairey Swordfish TSR biplanes. The Squadron carried out various exercises with ships and provided towed targets for naval air gunners and was decommissioned on 22 March 2016.

Second World War
The Squadron initially had a northern element (X Flight), and a southern element (Y Flight). 'X' Flight broke away on 28 September 1939 to become 772 Naval Air Squadron. The reshaped 771 NAS was based at RNAS Hatston flying a variety of fixed-wing aircraft, ranging from Supermarine Walruses to Hawker Hurricanes, from airfields across the UK and abroad.

A notable point in 771's wartime history was that they started the chain that led to the sinking of the German battleship Bismarck. The Commanding Officer of HMS Sparrowhawk, Capt Henry Lockhart St John Fancourt, RN, had been ordered to identify and sink the Bismarck at the earliest opportunity. The two squadrons of Albacoress he had did not have sufficient range to attack the battleship whilst in harbour. He was relying on the Royal Air Force to carry out flights over Bergen, and inform the Royal Navy when the Battleship had left port.  On 22 May 1941 RAF Coastal Command deemed the weather unsuitable for flight; however, Fancourt volunteered to put together a crew to fly 771's Martin Maryland twin-engined plane to carry out the sortie. Temporary Lieutenant (A) Noel Ernest Goddard, RNVR, at the time the Senior Pilot of 771 NAS, volunteered to pilot the sortie, with his crew of Acting Leading Airman John Walker Armstrong as TAG-WO and Leading Airman J. D. Milne as TAG-AG. The extremely experienced observer Commander Geoffry Alexander Rotherham, at the time the Air Station's XO, stepped up to act as Mission Commander. Goddard flew on instruments at low level over the sea, making landfall on target. Having identified that the ships had sailed already they attempted to radio their discovery back to RAF Coastal Command. However, they did not receive any reply. Rotherham decided to contact the Air Station directly on the Towed Target frequency and also fly directly to HMS Sparrowhawk's forward airfield, Sumburgh, where the Albacores were ready to intercept.
Acting on Rotherhams's radio message, the Home Fleet were set to sea and engage the Bismarck and her escorts intercepting her at the Battle of the Denmark Straits. On 16 September 1941 The London Gazette reported the awarding of the following honours: Rotherham received the DSO, Goddard the DSC, and Armstrong the DSM. Goddard went on to Command 771 NAS as a Temporary Lieutenant Commander (A) on 15 October 1941.
On 1 July 1942 771 NAS moved to RNAS Twatt to fly more modern aircraft in a similar role.

Post Second World War
In February 1945, 771 received the Sikorsky Hoverfly, making it the first naval air squadron to operate helicopters, which it used until May 1947. After victory in Europe the Fleet moved from Scapa Flow to Portsmouth and the anchorage at Portland. 771 NAS followed south to RNAS Zeals and then to RNAS Lee-on-Solent and RNAS Ford. Here the Squadron flew Miles Martinets, Douglas Bostons, Vought Corsairs, Grumman Wildcats, Airspeed Oxfords, Grumman Hellcats, Supermarine Seafires, North American Harvards, de Havilland Mosquitoes, Hawker Sea Furys, Short Sturgeons, as well as the Hoverfly. The Hoverflies were transferred to 705 Naval Air Squadron as it was formed. During the Defence reductions following the Second World War it was decided that 771 would be disbanded in August 1955 (whilst operating the Avro Anson, de Havilland Sea Hornet, Gloster Meteor, de Havilland Sea Vampire and Fairey Firefly) when it combined with 703 Naval Air Squadron to form 700 Naval Air Squadron.

Helicopter-only squadron
771 NAS reformed in 1961 and assumed the helicopter trials and training roles from 700 NAS with the Westland Whirlwind, Westland Dragonfly, and the Westland Wasp prototype at RNAS Portland. During this time 771 was able to pioneer and develop many Search And Rescue techniques; including helicopter in-flight refueling (HIFR), hi-line transfer, free diver drop and cliff winching techniques. Soon after standing up again, the Squadron gained two Westland Whirlwind HAR.3s and assumed the RNAS Portland SAR commitment. The Squadron was disbanded on 1 December 1964, on being absorbed into 829 Naval Air Squadron.

On 23 June 1967, the squadron reformed with the new primary task of anti-submarine warfare (ASW) Fleet Requirements Unit, in addition to the Portland SAR duty. Nine Whirlwind HAS.7 were used by the Squadron at this time. The Westland Wessex was introduced in 1969 with the Mk 1. This marked the beginning of a long association of the aircraft with the squadron. By 1970, the ASW role had been passed on to 737 Naval Air Squadron, making SAR 771's primary role, a role that has remained to the present day.

The Squadron moved to RNAS Culdrose in September 1974. Six of its Wessex aircraft were left at RNAS Portland, to form the basis of 772 Naval Air Squadron. The Wessex HAS.1 was replaced by the twin turbine-powered Wessex HU.5 in 1979, when it was involved with the 1979 Fastnet race rescues. During the Falklands Conflict all of 771 aircraft were taken for troop transport roles, some went to 722 Naval Air Squadron, but the majority reformed 847 Naval Air Squadron and 848 Naval Air Squadron along with some of 771 NASs aircrew. The remaining crew went either to their old aircraft type, or to new roles in the Lynx or Wasp fleets. Two Wessex Mk.5 from Wroughton were used in August 1982 to form the backbone of 771 NAS as it took the SAR commitment back from the RAF. In January 1983 the Squadron once again operated mixed fleets of rotary and fixed wing aircraft as it absorbed the Station Flight, taking ownership of two Chipmunks and 2 Sea Devons. It operated these until the end of 1989 when the Sea Devon was withdrawn from service. In 1985 the Squadron absorbed 707 Naval Air Squadron's Wessex helicopters when 771 NAS took over Commando Helicopter Training. The Wessex were replaced by Westland Sea King HAS.5s, converted to HAR.5s, in October 1987 as the Squadron assumed a long range, day/night and all weather SAR capability. In July 2001, 771 Squadron assumed the responsibility for Advanced and Operational Flying Training for anti-submarine warfare (ASW) pilots and Observers, as well as the residual Sea King HAS.5 & HAS.6 Pilot Conversion and Refresher Courses.

In its final years the Squadron operated the Sea King HAR.5 in the grey and red colours, with nine permanently stationed at RNAS Culdrose. 771's sister unit, Gannet Flight operates 3 HAR.5s performing a similar role from HMS Gannet on Prestwick Airport. 771's primary role was one of military Search and Rescue, with secondary roles in civilian Search and Rescue, Pilot and Observer refresher training, utility and liaison and ab-initio Pilot Conversion and operational training. To perform these roles, one of the helicopters was on 15 minutes notice to fly during the day, and 45 minutes during the night, with a duty crew on call for 24 hours. This duty was maintained for 365 days of the year, with a second standby aircraft ready to assist should the emergency have demanded it.

It stopped rescue duties on 1 January 2016 and was decommissioned on 22 March 2016. The squadron was responsible for saving over 15,000 lives on more than 9,000 missions.

Ace of Clubs
771s Helicopters feature the unofficial Ace of Clubs Squadron Logo. The origin of this logo is unclear, but it is widely believed to follow a similar pedigree as the Royal Navy Historic Flight Hawker Sea Hawk, wearing 806 NAS's Ace of Diamonds logo. Shortly after the Second World War Squadrons of the Fleet Air Arm often had an in-house display team. Each of the display aircraft were painted with identification marks. Playing card suits were chosen by some Squadrons as they were a neat identification that allows clear hierarchy; the Squadron Commanding Officer would take the Ace card, the XO the King and so on until each aircraft had a value relating to the seniority in the Squadron/display team of that pilot. Today 771 does not assign an aircraft to each pilot, instead operating a pool of aircraft allowing each pilot to fly any helicopter. It was chosen that only the Ace of Clubs would be painted on each of the helicopters in the Squadrons fleet.

Rescues
771 NAS was one of the busiest SAR units in the UK being called out an average of 220 times per year. With the limitations in civilian flight rules for the Cornwall Air Ambulance pilots 771 was also often called upon to perform patient and hospital transfers throughout the West Country.  These were typically when the Air Ambulance was engaged in other duties, in poor weather, at night or where no suitable landing place was close by, allowing the Sea King to utilise its winch.
Individual honours have included 4 George Medals, 4 Air Force Crosses, 6 Queens Gallantry Medals, and 14 Queen's Commendation for Bravery awards.  Some of the more memorable rescues have been:
 1978 – Ben Asdale, Air Force Cross awarded to Lt AJM Hogg RN, and Lt Cdr MJ Norman RN
 1979 – Fastnet Race, Air Force Cross awarded to Lt Jerry Grayson for his role in the Fastnet '79 Race. It was awarded a year later in 1980.
 1985 – Fastnet Race, George Medal awarded to the Rescue Diver; POACMN L Slater for his rescue of Simon Le Bon and 19 other survivors from the Yacht Drum
 1985 – Yacht Master Cube
 1989 – MV Secil Japan, Air Force Medal awarded to the Rescue Diver CPOACMN JPR Grinney
 1989 – MV Murree, George Medal awarded to each of the 2 Rescue Divers; POACMN DS Wallace, POACMN SW Wright
 1992 – Boyd Trophy won for night rescue of five crew from yacht Sine Seorra off Guernsey, Air Force Medal awarded to LA I Chambers
 2004 – Boyd Trophy won for Boscastle Flood rescues, Air Force Cross awarded to Lt Cdr MJ Ford RN
 2005 – Boyd Trophy won for the recovery of critically ill crewman from fishing vessel 240 miles off coast in gale-force winds and very poor visibility
 2007 – MSC Napoli, PO J O'Donnel awarded Queen's Gallantry Medal
 2008 – Pesca del Verdes, CPOACMN D Rigg awarded Queen's Gallantry Medal
 2009 – Fishing Vessel Trevessa, PO D Lacy awarded Queen's Gallantry Medal
 2011 – Yacht Andriette, Sgt A Russell RM awarded George Medal for his role in the rescue

RN SAR 60
As one of only two commissioned units of the ten that have operated in the dedicated Royal Navy Search and Rescue role, 771 NAS were a core part of the year-long celebration to recognise 60 years of RN Helicopter Search and Rescue in 2013. Events took place throughout the country and media all year, with the RN SAR Force raising £60,000 for charity.

Aircraft Operated by 771 NAS
There are 68 different marks of aircraft known to have been operated by 771 NAS.

Commanding officers

References

External links
 Fleet Air Arm – Naval Air Squadrons – 771 Official RN site
 helis.com – 771 NAS page

Military of the United Kingdom in Cornwall
700 series Fleet Air Arm squadrons
Military units and formations established in 1939
Military units and formations disestablished in 2016